Specialisterne (The Specialists) is a Danish social innovator company using the characteristics of people with autistic spectrum disorders (ASDs) including autism and Asperger syndrome as competitive advantages in the business market.

Specialisterne provides services such as software testing, quality control and data conversion for business companies in Denmark (and Canada).
In addition Specialisterne assesses and trains people with ASD to meet the requirements of the business sector.

The company provides a working environment in which ASD is integral, and where the role of the management and staff is to create the best possible working environment for the employees with ASD.

Background 

The youngest son of Specialisterne founder Thorkil Sonne, Lars, was diagnosed as having "infantile autism, normal intelligence", at age three, denoting and Autism Spectrum Disorder (ASD). Thorkil became active in the Danish Autism Association, then president of a local chapter of Autism Denmark, for three years, where he learned that people with ASD seldom have a chance to use their special skills in the labour market.

After 15 years working with IT within telecommunication companies, Thorkil knew the value of the skills he saw in people with ASD. With the support of his family, Thorkil founded Specialisterne in 2003, based on a loan on their house and his family's belief in his vision.

Today 

Specialisterne has more than 50 employees, approximately 75% of whom have a diagnosis within the autism spectrum. The head offices are in Copenhagen.  The company includes training programs to access and build up personal, social and professional skills for people with ASD – no formal education or job experiences are expected.  A number of appropriate strategies are used for individuals on the spectrum, including LEGO Mindstorms robot technology, helping to detect the strengths, the motivation and the development opportunities of the individual.

Services offered by Specialisterne include software tests, quality control, documentation and data entries with a high attention to details and accuracy for Danish and international customers like TDC A/S, Grundfos, KMD, CSC, Microsoft and Oracle.

Specialisterne maintains a focus on transferring knowledge on how to turn disabilities into abilities.  Speeches, workshops and courses are based on the method of positive thinking called The Dandelion Model. (The dandelion was symbolically chosen as a beneficial weed found in unexpected places, akin to the ethos of ASD including valuable skills.)

In December 2008, Thorkil Sonne donated all shares of Specialisterne to the Specialist People Foundation, a nonprofit organization founded by Sonne.

In September 2009, Specialisterne started a school where youth with ASD could get an education with focus on social development and interaction with its offices. The school is funded with help from the Lego Foundation and the Danish Ministry of Education.

In August 2010, Specialisterne opened in Scotland with David Farrell-Shaw as general manager. The Scottish company was a subsidiary of the social enterprise company Community Enterprise in Scotland (CEiS), funded by £700,000  from the Scottish government; the project also received £407,036 from the Big Lottery Fund and £30,000 from Glasgow City Council.

In October 2010, assisted by funding support from a European Commission's Lifelong Learning Programme called the Leonardo da Vinci programme (project number 2010-1-IS1-LEO05-00579), a project began to link Scotland, Denmark, Germany and Iceland. The Icelandic offering went live in January 2011.

In September 2012, Specialisterne Scotland closed. It has since re-opened in Glasgow and London. In 2013, Specialisterne opened an office in Canada. It is also opening branches in the United States, Dublin and Switzerland. A similar organisation in the United States, Aspiritech, is based on the same concept.

An Australian branch was founded in 2015, which then formed a partnership with the Dandelion Program and, in 2017, announced plans to form a partnership in New Zealand.

In 2017, a branch was founded in Milan, Italy.

See also
auticon

References

Further reading
 'Specialisterne: Sense & Details', Case Study, Harvard Business School
 Management Today
 The Independent
 Official website

Autism-related organizations
Service companies of Denmark
Companies of Scotland
Disability organizations based in Denmark
Accessibility